Lloyd Barnaby "Barney" Smith  (born 21 July 1945) is a retired British diplomat.

Career
Smith was educated at Merchant Taylors' School and Brasenose College, Oxford. He joined the Diplomatic Service in 1968 and served in Bangkok, Paris, Dublin, Brussels and Bangkok (with a year at the École nationale d'administration in Paris). He was ambassador to Nepal 1995–99 and ambassador to Thailand (concurrently non-resident ambassador to Laos) 2000–03. He was editor of Asian Affairs 2005–16. He was a non-executive director 2006–14, and chairman 2011–14, of Coastal Energy, an oil and gas company working in Thailand and Malaysia which was bought by CEPSA in 2014.

References
SMITH, Lloyd Barnaby, (Barney), Who's Who 2016, A & C Black, 2016 (online edition, Oxford University Press, 2015)

1945 births
Living people
People educated at Merchant Taylors' School, Northwood
Alumni of Brasenose College, Oxford
Members of HM Diplomatic Service
École nationale d'administration alumni
Ambassadors of the United Kingdom to Nepal
Ambassadors of the United Kingdom to Thailand
Ambassadors of the United Kingdom to Laos
20th-century British diplomats